A laboratory rubber stopper or a rubber bung or a rubber cork is mainly used in chemical laboratories in combination with flasks and test tube and also for fermentation in winery. Generally, in a laboratory, the sizes of rubber stoppers can be varied up to approximately 16 sizes and each of it is specific to certain type of container. As the rubber stopper is used in many experiments, some specific experiment requires a specific material. For example, the M35 Green neoprene stopper is for chemical resistance. For food fermentation, M18 white natural gum is preferred. For high temperature application, red or white silicone rubber stoppers should be used.

Sizes 

Rubber bungs can have one or more hole(s) for plugging in tubes depending on the specification of the procedures. To prevent the liquid chemical leaks or escape the container, the rubber bung should fit tightly to the container's opening; the dimension of the rubber bung is of concern. These are some of the sizes that are commonly seen in chemical laboratory.

Additional images

See also 
 Bung
 Cork borer

References

Laboratory equipment